The Zherban is a peak located in the Maramureș Mountains (Hutsul Alps). It is located in the Rakhiv Raion of the Zakarpattia Oblast, on the border of Ukraine with Romania.

References

Geography of Zakarpattia Oblast
Mountains of the Eastern Carpathians
One-thousanders of Ukraine